Nina Quartero (born Gladys Quartararo; March 17, 1908 – November 23, 1985) was an American actress whose career spanned from 1929 to 1943.

Career
Born in 1908 in Mount Vernon, New York, as Gladys Quartararo, she came from a close family and was the youngest of seven children. She often played supporting roles and sometimes a love interest for the lead male actor. In One Stolen Night (1928) Quartero was cast with Betty Bronson and William Collier. The story concerns a British World War I soldier who comes to the assistance of an enslaved dancer. In Frozen River (1929) she was paired with Raymond McKee as the motion picture's romantic leads. 

In 1931 Quartero appeared in Arizona, an early John Wayne movie. Playing "Conchita," she is a source of strife in Wayne's relationship to the characters depicted by Laura La Plante and June Clyde. She performed again with Wayne in The Man from Monterey (1933). Her final screen performances show Quartero playing smaller parts, such as the role of a Cuban dancer in Torchy Blane in Panama (1938), a native dancer in Green Hell (1940) and a bar-girl in A Lady Takes a Chance (1943).

Death
Nina Quartero died in Woodland Hills, California in 1985, aged 78.

Publicity stunt
Quartero once tried a publicity stunt by claiming that she was betrothed to Notre Dame All-American quarterback Frank Carideo. Carideo demanded a retraction of Quartero's engagement announcement, although he admitted he knew her from a time when each resided in Mount Vernon, New York. He had also visited her home, in Beverly Hills, California, prior to the 1930 University of Southern California game, to exchange greetings.

Partial filmography

The Sorrows of Satan (1926) - Vamp
Driftin' Sands (1928) - Nita Aliso
The Red Mark (1928) - Zelie
Noah's Ark (1928) - French Girl (uncredited)
The Redeeming Sin (1929) - Mitzi
One Stolen Night (1929) - Chyra
The Eternal Woman (1929) - Consuelo
Frozen River (1929) - Jane
Frontier Romance (1929, Short)
The Virginian (1929) - Girl in Bar (uncredited)
Isle of Escape (1930) - Loru
Golden Dawn (1930) - Maid-in-Waiting
Men of the North (1930) - Woolie-Woolie
New Moon (1930) - Vadda - Tanya's Maid
The Bachelor Father (1931) - Maria Credaro
 The Hawk (1931) - Teresa Valardi
God's Gift to Women (1931) - Suzanne - a Party Girl (uncredited)
Trapped (1931) - Sally Moore
The Fighting Sheriff (1931) - Tiana
Arizona (1931) - Conchita
Arizona Terror (1931) - Lola
The Monkey's Paw (1933) - Nura
Hell Below (1933) - Nurse (uncredited)
The Devil's Brother (1933) - Rita
The Man from Monterey (1933) - Anita Garcia
Under Secret Orders (1933) - Carmencita Alverez
Sons of the Desert (1933) - Sons of the Desert Partygoer (uncredited)
The Cyclone Ranger (1935) - Nita Garcia
Vagabond Lady (1935) - Mike - Tony's Friend (uncredited)
Wife vs. Secretary (1936) - Cuban Telephone Operator (uncredited)
The Three Mesquiteers (1936) - Waitress
Two in a Crowd (1936) - Celito (uncredited)
Left-Handed Law (1937) - Chiquita
Submarine D-1 (1937) - Panama Percentage Girl (uncredited)
Torchy Blane in Panama (1938) - Cuban Dancer (uncredited)
Green Hell (1940) - Native Girl (uncredited)
A Lady Takes a Chance (1943) - Carmencita (final film role)

References

Sources
Charleston, West Virginia Gazette, One Stolen Night, Sunday, May 12, 1929, Page 39.
Lima, Ohio News, In Lima Theaters, Friday, August 30, 1929, Page 16.
New York Times, Carideo Denies Betrothal, January 4, 1931, Page 3.

External links

20th-century American actresses
American film actresses
American silent film actresses
Western (genre) film actresses
Actresses from New York City
1908 births
1985 deaths